Petri Tsutsunen is a Finnish male curler.

At the national level, he is a four-time Finnish men's champion curler (1985, 1986, 1987, 1988) and two-time Finnish mixed champion curler (2006, 2007).

Teams

Men's

Mixed

References

External links

 Petri Tsutsunen — jussiupn.kapsi.fi
 Curling — jussiupn.kapsi.fi
 

Living people
Finnish male curlers
Finnish curling champions
Year of birth missing (living people)
Place of birth missing (living people)
21st-century Finnish people